The 1950 Kansas Jayhawks football team represented the University of Kansas in the Big Seven Conference during the 1950 college football season. In their third season under head coach Jules V. Sikes, the Jayhawks compiled a 6–4 record (3–3 against conference opponents), finished fourth in the Big Seven Conference, and outscored all opponents by a combined total of 284 to 188. They played their home games at Memorial Stadium in Lawrence, Kansas.

The team's statistical leaders included Wade Stinson with 1,129 rushing yards (the program's first 1,000-yard rusher) and 84 points scored, and Chet Strehlow with 651 passing yards. John Amberg and Mike McCormack were the team captains. Other notable members of the team included George Mrkonic.

Schedule

References

Kansas
Kansas Jayhawks football seasons
Kansas Jayhawks football